Bell Township is the name of some places in the U.S. state of Pennsylvania:

 Bell Township, Clearfield County, Pennsylvania
 Bell Township, Jefferson County, Pennsylvania
 Bell Township, Westmoreland County, Pennsylvania

See also 
 Bell Township (disambiguation)

Pennsylvania township disambiguation pages